Olivia Musgrave, Baroness Gardiner of Kimble (born 1958) is an Irish sculptor.

Biography
Olivia Musgrave was born in Dublin in 1958. She studied Political Science in Paris and lived in Italy. She then studied at the City and Guilds of London Institute under sculptor Allan Sly.

Her work is reminiscent of Greek mythology and Marino Marini, Arturo Martini, El Greco and Giacomo Manzù. It can be found at the John Martin Gallery in London, the Royal Hibernian Academy and Jorgensen Fine Art in Dublin, the Everard Read Gallery in Johannesburg, South Africa, and the Somerville Manning Gallery in the US. She is a Fellow of the Royal Society of Sculptors and a Member of the Society of Portrait Sculptors. In 2014 she was elected President of the Society of Portrait Sculptors.

In 2004, she married John Gardiner, Baron Gardiner of Kimble.

References

Living people
1958 births
Artists from Dublin (city)
Irish sculptors
Spouses of life peers
Gardiner of Kimble